Melanactes is a genus of click beetles in the family Elateridae. There are about five described species in Melanactes.

Species
These five species belong to the genus Melanactes:
 Melanactes consors LeConte, 1853 b
 Melanactes densus LeConte, 1853 b
 Melanactes morio (Fabricius, 1798) b
 Melanactes piceus (DeGeer, 1774) b
 Melanactes puncticollis (LeConte, 1852) b
Data sources: i = ITIS, c = Catalogue of Life, g = GBIF, b = Bugguide.net

References

Further reading

External links

 

Elateridae